Stanisław (Salomon Naftali) Mendelson (18 November 1858 in Warsaw - 25 July 1913 in Warsaw) was a Polish socialist politician and publicist of Jewish descent. He was an activist of Polish and international workers' movement.

He was one of the main activists and creators of the first programme of the Polish Socialist Party. In 1875-1878 he helped organize socialist groups in Warsaw. In 1878 Mendelson emigrated to Switzerland, and later lived in France and the United Kingdom. He was the co-founder and editor of the first Polish socialist magazines - Równość, Przedświt and Walka Klas.

In 1880 he was accused, together with other activists, in a judicial process with socialists in Kraków. In 1882-1884 he organized socialist groups in Poznań and was eventually imprisoned by Prussian authorities. Being a skilled organizer and publicist, Mendelson personally befriended many foremost European socialists - Friedrich Engels, Karl Liebknecht, Eduard Bernstein, Karl Kautsky, Paul Lafargue, Georgi Plekhanov and others.

Works 
 Kwestyja polska i polityka koła polskiego (1893)
 Historia ruchu komunistycznego we Francji w 1871 (1904)

References

1858 births
1913 deaths
19th-century Polish Jews
Polish publicists
Polish socialists
Politicians from Warsaw
Poles - political prisoners in the Prussian partition